The Nickelodeon Indonesia Kids' Choice Awards was the Indonesian version of the Nickelodeon Kids' Choice Awards, held since 2008 in Jakarta. Indonesia is the second country in Asia which organized this award, after the Philippines. The program is produced and aired by the Indonesian television station, Global TV .

Locations and hosts

Winners and nominees
Winners are listed on bold.

2008

2009

2010

2011

2012

2013

2014

2015

2016

2017

See also
 List of Asian television awards

Notes

References

External links
 Indonesia Kids Choice Awards

Indonesian television awards
Indonesian music awards
Nickelodeon Kids' Choice Awards
Awards established in 2008
Awards disestablished in 2017